"The Mother of All Demos" is a name retroactively applied to a landmark computer demonstration, given at the Association for Computing Machinery / Institute of Electrical and Electronics Engineers (ACM/IEEE)—Computer Society's Fall Joint Computer Conference in San Francisco, by Douglas Engelbart, on December 9, 1968.

The live demonstration featured the introduction of a complete computer hardware and software system called the oN-Line System or, more commonly, NLS. The 90-minute presentation demonstrated for the first time many of the fundamental elements of modern personal computing: windows, hypertext, graphics, efficient navigation and command input, video conferencing, the computer mouse, word processing, dynamic file linking, revision control, and a collaborative real-time editor. Engelbart's presentation was the first to publicly demonstrate all of these elements in a single system. The demonstration was highly influential and spawned similar projects at Xerox PARC in the early 1970s. The underlying concepts and technologies influenced both the Apple Macintosh and Microsoft Windows graphical user interface operating systems in the 1980s and 1990s.

Background
Much of Engelbart's thought that led to the development of his Augmentation Research Center (ARC), as well as the oN-Line System, was derived from the "research culture" of World War II and the early Cold War. A notable source of inspiration to Engelbart was the article "As We May Think", written by Vannevar Bush in The Atlantic magazine, which Engelbart read while stationed as a US Navy radar technician in the Philippines in 1946. In Engelbart's view, in order to steer society into the right use of scientific knowledge derived from the war, that knowledge would need to be better managed and regulated.

In his book From Counterculture to Cyberculture, Fred Turner gave voice to this view, which arose from seeing the unintended effects of technology on the postwar world:
[T]he American military had developed technologies with which it might destroy the world. In its wake, scientists and technologists had begun to fan out around the globe, seeking to use their knowledge to eradicate disease and increase food production, often in an effort to win the cold war loyalties of Third World nations. Engelbart had read about these efforts and saw that they often backfired. Rapid food production led to the depletion of the soil; the eradication of insects led to ecological imbalances.

This ultimately led to the idea that beyond merely performing calculations, computers could be used to augment the capabilities of the human mind.

Demonstration

Engelbart had assembled a team of computer engineers and programmers at his Augmentation Research Center (ARC) located in Stanford University's Stanford Research Institute (SRI) in the early 1960s. His idea was to free computing from merely being about number crunching and for it to become a tool for communications and information-retrieval. He wanted to turn Vannevar Bush's idea for a Memex machine into reality, where a machine used interactively by one person could "augment" their intelligence.

Over the course of six years, with the funding help of both NASA and ARPA, his team went about putting together all the elements that would make such a computer system a reality. At the urging of ARPA's director, Robert Taylor, the NLS would make its first public appearance at the 1968 Fall Joint Computer Conference in San Francisco's Civic Auditorium.

The conference session was presented under the title A research center for augmenting human intellect. Approximately 1,000 computer professionals were in attendance in the auditorium to witness the presentation. Notable attendees in the audience included Alan Kay, Charles Irby and Andy van Dam, as well as Bob Sproull.

Engelbart, with the help of his geographically distributed team (including Bill Paxton), with Bill English directing the presentation's technical elements, demonstrated NLS's functions.

The Augment researchers also created two customized homemade modems at 1200 baudhigh-speed for 1968linked via a leased line to transfer data from the computer workstation keyboard and mouse at the Civic Auditorium  to their Menlo Park headquarters' SDS-940 computer.

In order to provide live two-way video between the lab and the conference hall, two microwave links were used. English also commanded a video switcher that controlled what was displayed on the big screen. The camera operator in Menlo Park was Stewart Brand—at the time, a non-computer person, best known as the editor of the Whole Earth Catalog—who also advised Engelbart and the team about how to present the demo.

During the 90-minute presentation, Engelbart used his mouse prototype to move around the screen, highlight text, and resize windows. This was the first time that an integrated system for manipulating text onscreen was presented publicly.

At separate times, his Augment associates Jeff Rulifson and Bill Paxton appeared in another portion of the screen to help edit the text remotely from ARC. While they were editing they could see each other's screen, talk and see each other as well. He further demonstrated that clicking on underlined text would then link to another page of information, demonstrating the concept of hypertext.

When he finished the demonstration, the audience gave him a standing ovation. To further demonstrate the system, a separate room was set aside so that attendees could take a closer look at the NLS workstations and ask Engelbart questions. One last notion is that of Engelbart's NLS system. As Fred Turner stated in his book From Counterculture to Cyberculture:
Engelbart promulgated a philosophy of 'bootstrapping', in which each experimental transformation of the socio-technical system that was the NLS would feed back into the system itself, causing it to evolve (and presumably to improve).

Influence

Prior to the demonstration, a significant portion of the computer science community thought Engelbart was "a crackpot". When he was finished, he was described as "dealing lightning with both hands". Van Dam was working on a similar system, but had only begun work on it in 1967, and was stunned to see how mature NLS was: he practically accosted Engelbart with his line of questioning in the post-presentation question and answer session. After he finished interrogating Engelbart, van Dam agreed the NLS demo was the greatest thing he ever witnessed. Van Dam would go on to become a leader in teaching computer graphics in the 1970s. The actual impact on computer science, however, was limited:

As the 1970s started, much of Engelbart's team departed ARC and went their own ways, with many of them ending up at the Xerox Palo Alto Research Center (PARC). Among these people were Bill English, who would further improve upon the mouse. Also migrating to PARC was Engelbart's former backer at NASA and ARPA, Robert Taylor. Alan Kay, also in attendance at the demo, would go on to design an object-oriented computing environment called Smalltalk while he was at PARC.

By 1973, the Xerox Alto was a fully functional personal computer similar to the NLS terminal which Engelbart had demonstrated in 1968, but much smaller and physically refined. With its mouse-driven GUI, the Alto would go on to influence Steve Jobs and Apple's Macintosh computer and operating system in the 1980s. Eventually, Microsoft's Windows operating system would follow the Macintosh and use a multi-button mouse like the Alto and the NLS system did.

Engelbart's influence peaked at the conference, and he was mostly remembered throughout the 1970s and much of the 1980s as the inventor of the mouse and hypertext, famously adapted by Apple and Microsoft. On the demo's 30th anniversary in 1998, Stanford University held a major conference to celebrate Engelbart's visionary impact on computing and the World Wide Web. By the time the 40th anniversary was celebrated, Engelbart's demo was acknowledged as one of the most important in computer history.

In 2015, a performance art musical presentation called The Demo depicted the event. It was composed and performed by Mikel Rouse and Ben Neill, with its premiere at Stanford's Bing Concert Hall.

Origin of nickname
The first use of this name for Engelbart's talk is ascribed to journalist Steven Levy in his 1994 book Insanely Great: The Life and Times of Macintosh, the Computer That Changed Everything, where he describes the event as "a calming voice from Mission Control as the truly final frontier whizzed before their eyes. It was the mother of all demos."  The terminology reflected contemporary use of phrases of form "mother of all ..." given currency by then-President of Iraq Saddam Hussein's proffer of a "mother of all battles", in lead-up to the 1991 Gulf War.

See also

References

Notes

Citations

Bibliography

External links
  – comprehensive portal page maintained by the Doug Engelbart Institute with links to annotated video footage at various sites, retrospectives, photos, conference proceedings, program, tribute sites, etc.
 , includes background, links, archival reports and papers, oral history, etc.; previously included streaming video of the demo in full, and in annotated clips
  Documentary about Doug Engelbart.

1968 in California
1968 speeches
events in California
history of computing hardware
history of human–computer interaction
history of San Francisco
science and technology in the San Francisco Bay Area
SRI International